Dennis Bradley (born. c. 1983) is an American attorney and politician serving in the Connecticut State Senate, representing District 23 since January 9, 2019.

Background and education
Bradley is of Dominican heritage. Bradley received his Juris Doctor from the University of Massachusetts School of Law, and prior to that received his bachelor's degree in political science and government from Norwich University.

Professional career
Since 2008, Bradley has served as Principal Partner at the law firm Bradley, Denkovich and Karayiannis, P.C. Bradley also served as a campaign associate for the congressional campaign of Jim Himes.

2018 general election for Connecticut State Senate, District 23

On November 6, 2018, Bradley ran against Republican John Rodriguez for the office of Senator for Connecticut’s 23rd State Senate District.

Bradley won the election with 86.5% of the vote, with a total of 12,636 ballots cast in his favor.

In May 2021, he was arrested on federal charges.

References

External links

American politicians of Dominican Republic descent
Living people
Hispanic and Latino American state legislators in Connecticut
21st-century American politicians
Businesspeople from Connecticut
Democratic Party Connecticut state senators
Norwich University alumni
University of Massachusetts Dartmouth alumni
Connecticut lawyers
1983 births